John Edwin Nock (13 January 1909 – 1996) was an English footballer.

He played for Dinnington Athletic, Silverwood Colliery, Rotherham United, Scarborough, Bacup Borough, Accrington Stanley and Rossendale United.

Notes

External links
RootsWeb profile

1909 births
1996 deaths
Footballers from Rotherham
English footballers
Association football forwards
Dinnington Athletic F.C. players
Silverwood Colliery F.C. players
Rotherham United F.C. players
Scarborough F.C. players
Bacup Borough F.C. players
Accrington Stanley F.C. (1891) players
Rossendale United F.C. players
English Football League players